Vitularia salebrosa is a species of sea snail, a marine gastropod mollusk in the family Muricidae, the murex snails or rock snails.

Description

Distribution
V. salebrosa is found on the tropical Pacific coast of America, from Baja California to Peru.  It lives under rocks in the intertidal and subtidal zones.

Feeding

This species is an ectoparasite of other molluscs.  Members of the species bore a hole through the host's shell and suck its blood or digestive organ (depending on the prey) over a period of months. Consistent with their suctorial feeding habit, they have a long proboscis, reduced buccal mass, and simplified digestive system compared to other Muricids.

Prey include the oyster Ostrea cf. fisheri , the limpet-like slipper shell Crucibulum spinosum, and the vermetid gastropod Tripsycha (Eualetes) tulipa.

See also
 Genkaimurex varicosus, an ectoparasite of scallops in Japanese waters.(Herbert, 2009, citing Matsukuma, 1977)

References

External links

 1845 description in English and Latin by Reeve, with illustrations by G. B. Sowerby.

Gastropods described in 1832
Muricopsinae